is a traditional Japanese percussion instrument used in folk songs, and rural dances. It was originally used as a cleaning tool. The instrument is made up of several wooden plates strung together with a cotton cord, with handles at both ends. The stack of wooden plates are played by moving them like a wave.

References

External links 

All about Hand Percussion - Techniques, notation and applications (Google Books)
  "Binzasara: Music and Dance at Sensōji in Edo/Tōkyō"

Japanese musical instruments
Plaque concussion idiophones